The 1968 Pro Bowl was the National Football League's eighteenth annual all-star game which featured the outstanding performers from the  season. The game was played on January 21, 1968, at Los Angeles Memorial Coliseum in Los Angeles, California.

Scoring three touchdowns in the fourth quarter, the favored Western Conference rallied for a 38–20 victory, breaking the Eastern Conference's two-game winning streak. Running back Gale Sayers of the Chicago Bears was named the back of the game for the second year in a row and linebacker Dave Robinson of the league champion Green Bay Packers received the lineman of the game honors.

Attendance at the game was 53,289. The game had controversy because East coach Otto Graham of the Washington Redskins benched quarterback Fran Tarkenton of the New York Giants in the fourth quarter. Some players questioned the benching of a player of Tarkenton’s stature in a charity game. The coach of the West squad was Don Shula of the Baltimore Colts, who won his second Pro Bowl in four years. The game was played a week after the second Super Bowl, which was held in Miami.

References

External links

Pro Bowl
Pro Bowl
Pro Bowl 
Pro Bowl
Pro Bowl
National Football League in Los Angeles
January 1968 sports events in the United States